The International Exhibition Co-operative Wine Society Limited, commonly referred to as The Wine Society, is the world's oldest wine club having been founded on 4 August 1874 at the Royal Albert Hall in London, United Kingdom.

The Wine Society was created and still operates as a co-operative with each member being the owner of one share.

It has received several accolades from the wine trade industry throughout the years and is currently Decanter Outstanding Retailer of the Year (for the seventh time in eight years) and the IWC Wine Club of the Year (for the third consecutive year).

History 

The foundation of The Wine Society followed the last of the great Annual International Exhibitions. Various countries had sent large quantities of wine in cask to the exhibition to be stored and poured in the cellars of the Royal Albert Hall, but visitors to the exhibition were unaware of its presence. With no return to show for their investment, the growers from Portugal appealed to the British Government for assistance. In response to this, a series of lunches was held to publicise the wines. The organisers of this publicity drive were the "Committee of Gentlemen" that would become the founding fathers of The Wine Society:

Major-General Henry Young Darracott Scott was one of the architects of the Royal Albert Hall and Secretary to the Great Exhibition Commissioners. After many of the lunch guests expressed an interest in purchasing wine, Major-General Scott proposed the setting up of "a co-operative company" to buy good quality wines on a regular basis to sell to members. He served as The Wine Society's first Treasurer until his death in 1883.

Robert Brudenell Carter FRCS was a Fellow of the Medical Society of London and worked as an ophthalmic surgeon at St George's Hospital. He had previously served as a staff surgeon during the Crimean War. Carter replaced Major-General Scott as Treasurer and in 1895 became The Wine Society's second chairman. He remained a member of the Committee until his death at the age of 90. More than anyone else, Carter was responsible for the supervision and conduct of The Wine Society during its first forty years.

George E. Scrivenor, a senior Customs and Excise official, became the first Honorary general manager and did much of the early day-to-day work of The Wine Society until another appointment forced his resignation in 1876.

Although there is no evidence explaining why Major-General Scott suggested following the example of the Rochdale Pioneers to form a co-operative society rather than a joint stock company, the founding members' aim was to buy wines direct from growers to ensure their authenticity and quality and to offer them to members at fair prices.

The "Objects of the Society" were originally published as follows:

 To purchase and import Foreign Wines, and to sell them at cheap rates to Members of the Society.
 To introduce, in addition to the Wines in general domestic use, other Foreign Wines hitherto unknown or but little known in this country.
 To endeavour to obtain Wines direct from the growers, in a pure, unadulterated condition, and, as far as possible, free from added spirit.
 The Society is enrolled under the Industrial and Provident Societies' Act, 1876.
 The Interest of a Member is limited to One Share.
 No Dividend will at any time be payable on the Shares, which will form the Working Capital of the Society.
 Wines will be sold at the lowest possible price, and for ready money only.

The first Chairman of The Wine Society was Norman MacLeod, the 25th Chief of the Clan MacLeod. The first Trustee was Earl Spencer KG, the Liberal statesman, who had also been one of the Great Exhibition Commissioners.

Other famous members during The Wine Society's early years included Sir Arthur Conan-Doyle, the Rt Hon Earl Russell, Sir Henry Wood and Alexander Fleming.

The Wine Society grew gradually and, without any external shareholders to consider, surplus trading profits were used to provide better services to members and to increase the value of its wines.

By 1965, The Wine Society was operating out of three separate cellars in London: one under the London Palladium, one at Joiner Street under London Bridge Station and one at St James's Bond in Rotherhithe (which flooded at high tide).

In 1965, thanks to the foresight of the then chairman Edmund Penning-Rowsell and treasurer Norman Alexander, The Wine Society moved to more suitable premises in Stevenage to the north of London, where all its operations have since been concentrated.

Membership 
In order to trade with The Wine Society, proof of membership is required as only members with share certificates are able to purchase its wines. People may be proposed for membership either by other existing members or by The Wine Society's company secretary by filling a form with formal election to membership following within a short time. Buying a share of the society provides lifetime membership and a share can be bequeathed to a family member or friend.

Wine buyers 
The Wine Society's eight buyers, who have been referred to as "some of the best noses in the business", are briefed to buy only wines that they are enthusiastic about from producers who share their passion for quality at all price levels.

The team is led by Pierre Mansour and includes three Masters of Wine: Sebastian Payne MW, Joanna Locke MW and Sarah Knowles MW. Two previous Heads of Buying who have now stepped down still make up part of the team of Buyers; Tim Sykes, who headed up the department from 2012 to 2017 and Sebastian Payne MW who was Head of Buying between 1986 and 2012.

According to Charles Metcalfe of the International Wine Challenge, "much of The Society's success is down to the buyers – truffle-snufflers, experts at finding interesting parcels from smaller producers and not buying for the sake of fashion."

Management 
The board of The Wine Society is known as the Committee and it consists of up to 13 members.  Eight are elected by the membership; one is the Chief executive; and up to another four may be co-opted for limited periods by the eight elected members.  The elected members appoint from their number the chairman and Deputy chairman (known as the Officers).

The Committee has responsibility to the members for the direction of the business, with day-to-day management in the hands of an executive team led by the Chief executive. The current CEO is Stephen Finlan.

See also 
Classification of wine
Wine tasting
Opimian Society
British co-operative movement

References

External links 
The Wine Society

Organizations established in 1874
Retail companies established in 1874
Consumers' co-operatives of the United Kingdom
Wine tasting
1874 establishments in England